"Hush" is a song written by American singer Emily Osment and Canadian singer Josh Ramsay. They decided to collaborate when Osment went on a trip to Canada to film a movie, and met Ramsay. They immediately hit it off, and decided to write a song together. It officially premiered on Much Music on April 26, 2011.  The song was sent to Canadian radio on May 10, 2011, and released to Canada's iTunes Store on the same day. Osment confirmed on her official Twitter that there will be a music video for the song to be released in September. The music video never materialized and the song has only been released exclusively in Canada.

Track listing 
"Hush"

Charts

Release history

References

2011 singles
Emily Osment songs
Male–female vocal duets
Songs written by Josh Ramsay